Edward II of Bar (c.1340 – May 1352) was Henry IV of Bar's eldest son and successor as count of Bar (with Edward's mother Yolande of Flanders ruling as count during his minority, which ended on 10 October 1349).  He had no male issue and was succeeded as count by his younger brother Robert I of Bar.

Notes

References

1339 births
1352 deaths
Counts of Bar